Conan, My Beautician is a 2016 Philippine television situational comedy series broadcast by GMA Network. Directed by Adolf Alix Jr., it stars Mark Herras and Megan Young. It premiered on June 26, 2016 replacing Alamat. The series concluded on September 18, 2016 with a total of 13 episodes. It was replaced by Usapang Real Love in its timeslot.

The series is streaming online on YouTube.

Premise
Conan came from a family of barbers, he is a straight guy who is forced to work in a beauty salon in Manila after his family was forced to escape from their hometown. He pretends as a flamboyant beautician at Salon Paz. He will find himself falling in love with Ava, the bride he is supposed to work for.

Cast and characters

Lead cast
 Mark Herras as Conan
 Megan Young as Ava

Supporting cast
Lotlot de Leon as Perla
Cacai Bautista / Candy Pangilinan as Chika la Chaka
Balang Bughaw as Conor
Atak Arana as Greg
Betong Sumaya as Mimi
Divine Tetay as Pia
Vengie Labalan as Mrs. Paz
Rodjun Cruz as Prince
Lovely Abella as Sharon
Ken Anderson as Gabby
Mailes Kanapi as Ava's mom
Juliene Medoza as Ava's dad

Guest cast
Boobsie Wonderland as Dubbie
Chlaui Malayao as Debbie
Gemma Gonzaga as Iluminada
Antonette Garcia as Betty
Mike Tan as Mike
Angelica Jones as Kiray
Benedick Rellama as Kiko
Menggie Cobarrubias as Don Alfonso
Jay Manalo as Conrado
John Manalo as young Prince
Elijah Alejo as young Ava

Episodes

Accolades

References

External links
 
 

2016 Philippine television series debuts
2016 Philippine television series endings
Filipino-language television shows
GMA Network original programming
Philippine comedy television series
Philippine television sitcoms
Television shows set in the Philippines